The Sea Bird 37 is a Canadian sailboat that was designed by Stan Huntingford and Hardin International as a cruiser and first built in 1973.

The design was developed into a motorsailer with a new deck and pilothouse, designated the Sea Bird 37 MS.

Production
The design was built by Cooper Enterprises in Port Coquitlam, British Columbia, starting in 1973, but the company went out of business in 1990 and it is now out of production. It was also built by Hardin International in Kaohsiung, Taiwan during their time in business of 1977 - 1988.

Design
The Sea Bird 37 is a recreational keelboat, built predominantly of fibreglass, with wood trim. It was built with a choice of either a ketch or masthead sloop rig and an aft or centre cockpit. The boat has a raked stem, a nearly plumb transom, a/an keel-mounted rudder controlled by a wheel  and a fixed long keel. It displaces  and carries  of ballast.

The centre cockpit version has sleeping accommodation for six people, with two single berths in the bow cabin, a drop-down dinette table in the main cabin and an aft cabin with a transverse double berth. The galley is located on the starboard side just forward of the companionway ladder. The galley is "U"-shaped and is equipped with a two-burner stove, an ice box and a sink. There are two heads, one in the forepeak, forward of the bow cabin and one on the starboard side in the aft cabin.

See also
List of sailing boat types

References

Keelboats
1970s sailboat type designs
Sailing yachts 
Trailer sailers
Sailboat type designs by Stan Huntingford
Sailboat types built by Cooper Enterprises
Sailboat types built by Hardin International